The Embassy of Georgia in The Hague is the diplomatic mission of Georgia to the Kingdom of the Netherlands. It is located at Lange Vijverberg 12 in The Hague. The Embassy was established in 2007 after the establishment of diplomatic relations between Georgia and the Netherlands on April 22, 1992 and relocated to its current address in 2017. Prior to the opening of the Embassy, Georgia covered diplomatic relations with the Netherlands through its diplomatic mission in Brussels.

The Embassy also serves as a Consulate of Georgia in The Hague and serves citizens of Georgia residing throughout the whole of the Netherlands.

Areas of Cooperation 
Embassy Sections:
 Consular Affairs;
 Political Affairs;
 Economic Affairs;
 Cultural Affairs; and
 Representation to the International Organizations.

List of Georgian Ambassadors to the Kingdom of the Netherlands and Important Events

Georgian Ambassadors to the Kingdom of the Netherlands with residence in Brussels 
H.E. Salome Samadashvili (2005–2007)
H.E. Konstantine Zaldastanishvili (2000–2005)
H.E. Zurab Abashidze (1998–2000)

Georgian Ambassadors to the Kingdom of the Netherlands with Residence in The Hague 

H.E. Maia Panjikidze (2007–2010)
H.E. Shota Gvineria (2010–2014) 
H.E. Konstantine Surguladze (2014–2018) 
H.E. George Sharvashidze (2018–2020) 
H.E. David Solomonia (2021-current)

H.E. George Sharvashidze assumed office as the Ambassador of Georgia to the Kingdom of the Netherlands and to the Permanent Representative of Georgia to the Organisation for the Prohibition of Chemical Weapons (OPCW) on December 1, 2018 and 18 days later, presented Letters of Credence to His Majesty King Willem-Alexander on December 19, 2018.

On March 12, 2020, the Embassy of Georgia hosted a delegation of 15 Agroservice managers incoming for trade mission from Georgia to the Netherlands. The goal of the mission is to bring these entrepreneurs in contact with Dutch trading partners and to support them in the further development of their entrepreneurial qualities

On March 29, 2019, during the visit of H.E. Ms Thea Tsulukiani, Minister of Justice of Georgia, Georgia signed a cooperation agreement in criminal matters with Eurojust. The final document was signed in The Hague by Minister Tsulukiani, Chief Prosecutor Shalva Tadumadze and the head of Eurojust Ladislav Hamran. H.E. Mr George Sharvashidze and other high-ranking Georgian officials were present during the ceremony.

On April 24, 2019, Ambassador of Georgia to the Kingdom of the Netherlands, H.E. George Sharvashidze bestowed the Order of Honour to the Chairman of the Tilburg Byzantine Choir and the TBK Projects Fund, expert of PUM Netherlands, Johannes Cornelis de Bruijn for his extensive work and development of education for children with different kinds of autism in Georgia.

On May 26, 2019, in celebration of Georgia's Independence Day and the Ambassador's visit to the University of Groningen, Groningen's Martini Tower played several Georgian melodies throughout the day. Similarly, in memoriam of a late Georgian composer Giya Kancheli, several of his pieces were performed at the Grote of Sint-Jacobskerk (The Hague) after his passing.

During the COVID-19 pandemic of 2020, the Embassy of Georgia assisted 115 Georgian citizens with basic needs, shelter or health needs in the Netherlands and facilitated the organization of direct flights from Amsterdam to Tbilisi.

For the celebration of the restoration of Georgian Independence on May 26, 2020, the Embassy organized the playing of the Georgian national anthem and other Georgian melodies from the Grote of Sint-Jacobskerk (The Hague), Scheveningen's Oude Kerk, Voorschoten's Dorpskerk, Alphen aan den Rijn's Adventskerk, Groningen's Martinitoren, and Eindhoven's Catharinakerk.

After more than a year without ambassador to the Netherlands, Georgia appointed David Solomonia on October 4, 2021, as ambassador to the Netherlands. Solomonia is an experienced diplomat, serving Georgian diplomacy since 1995. Prior to the Netherlands he was ambassador to Brazil since 2017.

Consulate General of Georgia

 Consulate General of Georgia in The Hague: Lange Vijverberg 12, 2513 AC Den Haag
 Honorary Consul of Georgia in Amsterdam: Stadhouderskade 55, 1072 AB Amsterdam
 Honorary Consul of Georgia in South Holland: c/o Acomo, WTC, Beursplein 37, P.O. Box 30156, 3001 DD Rotterdam

See also 
 Georgia–Netherlands relations

References 

Diplomatic missions of Georgia (country)
Georgia (country)–Netherlands relations
Diplomatic missions in The Hague
Ambassadors of Georgia (country) to the Netherlands